Tamir Hendelman (b. 1971) is an Israeli-American jazz pianist.

Hendelman has performed with the Jeff Hamilton Trio, the Clayton-Hamilton Jazz Orchestra, Harry Allen, Teddy Edwards, Warren Vaché, Houston Person, Jeff Clayton, Nick Brignola, Phil Upchurch, Rickey Woodard, John Clayton and Barbara Morrison. He also leads his own trio and his debut CD Playground features him in this trio setting. His album Destinations features Lewis Nash and Marco Panascia. The album reached number one on the JazzWeek Jazz Charts in September 2010.

Biography
Born in Tel Aviv, Israel, Tamir Hendelman began his keyboard studies at age 6. In 1984, he moved to the United States and won Yamaha's National Keyboard competition two years later at age 14. Concerts in Japan and the Kennedy Center followed.

He then studied at the Tanglewood Institute in 1988 and received a Bachelor of Music Composition degree from Eastman School of Music in 1993. He became the youngest musical director for Lovewell Institute for the Creative Arts, a national arts education non-profit organization.

Since returning to Los Angeles in 1996, he has been in steady demand as pianist and arranger, touring the US, Europe, and Asia. He has also received awards from ASCAP and the National Foundation for Advancement in the Arts. In 1999, Tamir was a guest soloist with the Henry Mancini Institute Orchestra.

Hendelman is the pianist/arranger on Jackie Ryan's "You and the Night and the Music" and Janis Mann's "A Perfect Time". He is also featured on Natalie Cole's "Still Unforgettable" (WEA, 2008) and Barbra Streisand's Love Is the Answer (Columbia, 2009). In 2002 he also toured Europe with Tierney Sutton and the Bill Holman Big Band. Hendelman musically directed Julia Migenes's "Alter Ego" and played/arranged on Roberta Gambarini's "Easy To Love" (Now Forward, 2006). In 2010, he accompanied Streisand at her return engagement to the Village Vanguard in New York.

He is also bandleader of another trio in Los Angeles. The drummer Dean Koba has been part of it for years; on bass it's Dan Lutz or Carlito del Puerto.

Hendelman is married and has two daughters.

Jeff Hamilton Trio
Hendelman joined the Jeff Hamilton Trio in 2000, contributing arrangements, recording and touring Japan, Europe and the US. In 2001 he became a member of the Clayton-Hamilton Jazz Orchestra, with whom he premiered John Clayton's new orchestration of Oscar Peterson's Canadiana Suite at the Hollywood Bowl in 2001.

Clayton-Hamilton Jazz Orchestra
With the CHJO, Tamir has recorded for John Pizzarelli, Gladys Knight and Diana Krall.

Discography
 Destinations (Resonance, 2010) with Lewis Nash and Marco Panascia
 Playground (2008) with Jeff Hamilton and John Clayton

Notes

External links
 Tamir Hendelman Official Website
 Tamir Hendelman at Resonance Records
 Tamir Hendelman: Living a Dream, Interview by Judith Schlesinger for AAJ, December 29, 2009

Living people
Jewish Israeli musicians
Musicians from Tel Aviv
American jazz pianists
American male pianists
1971 births
21st-century American pianists
21st-century American male musicians
21st-century Israeli male musicians
American male jazz musicians
Clayton-Hamilton Jazz Orchestra members
Resonance Records artists